Heinrich "Hens" Gerardus Dekkers (May 6, 1915 – November 19, 1966) was a Dutch boxer who competed in the 1936 Summer Olympics in Berlin, Germany.

He was born in Rotterdam and died in The Hague. He was the older brother of Tin Dekkers.

In 1936 he was eliminated in the quarterfinals of the welterweight class after losing his fight to the upcoming silver medalist Michael Murach.

1936 Olympic results

Below is the record of Hens Dekkers, a Dutch welterweight boxer who competed at the 1936 Berlin Olympics:

 Round of 32: bye
 Round of 16: defeated Gaspard Deridder (Belgium) on points
 Quarterfinal: lost to Michael Murach (Germany) on points

External links

1915 births
1966 deaths
Welterweight boxers
Olympic boxers of the Netherlands
Boxers at the 1936 Summer Olympics
Boxers from Rotterdam
Dutch male boxers
Place of birth missing
Place of death missing